Events from the year 1544 in Ireland.

Incumbent
Monarch: Henry VIII

Events
July 19 – September 18: First Siege of Boulogne in France during the Italian War of 1542–1546. An Irish contingent serving with the English army is led by Piers Power, 2nd Lord Le Power and Curraghmore who is fatally wounded.
The Annals of Connacht end.

Births
Christopher Nugent, noble (d. 1602)

Deaths
c. March – Ulick na gCeann Burke, 1st Earl of Clanricarde, Clanricarde.

References

 
1540s in Ireland
Ireland
Years of the 16th century in Ireland